Igor Sumnikov (born 29 September 1966) is a Soviet former cyclist. He competed in the team time trial at the 1988 Summer Olympics. In 1984 Sumnikov was first in the World Championship, Road, 75km TTT Juniors. His best results are 2x Stage Tour du Vaucluse (1987).

References

External links
 

1966 births
Living people
Soviet male cyclists
Belarusian male cyclists
Olympic cyclists of the Soviet Union
Cyclists at the 1988 Summer Olympics
Cyclists from Minsk